Adis or variant, may refer to:

People
 Adis Ahmetovic, (born 1993), German-Bosnian politician
Adis Bećiragić (born 1970), Bosnian basketball player
 Adis Hodžić (born 1999), Slovenian soccer player
 Adis Jahović (born 1987), Macedonian soccer player
 Adis Lagumdzija (born 1989), Turkish volleyball player
 Adis Nurković (born 1986), Kosovar soccer player
 Adis Obad (born 1971), Bosnian soccer player and manager

Places
 The Abu Dhabi Indian School, Abu Dhabi, United Arab Emirates
 Adis, Carthaginian Empire; former name of Roman Empire era Uthina

Other uses
 Battle of Adis (255 BCE) in the First Punic War
 Adis, a New Zealand medical publisher owned by Springer Science+Business Media

See also

 Adiss Harmandian (1945–2019) Lebanese-Armenian pop singer
 
 Addis (disambiguation)
 Adiz (disambiguation)
 Adi (disambiguation)